The 1975 Cleveland mayoral election took place on November 4, 1975, to elect the Mayor of Cleveland, Ohio. Ralph Perk was reelected to a second consecutive term. The election was officially nonpartisan, with the top two candidates from the September 30 primary advancing to the general election.

Primary election

General election

References

1970s in Cleveland
Cleveland mayoral
Cleveland
Mayoral elections in Cleveland
Non-partisan elections
November 1975 events in the United States